Gaius Livius Drusus was a Roman politician who was consul in 147 BC, together with Scipio Aemilianus.

Family
Livius Drusus was a member of the plebeian gens Livia. His father was born to the patrician gens Aemilia, most likely a younger brother of Lucius Aemilius Paullus Macedonicus, who was adopted by Marcus Livius Drusus Salinator. He was the father of Gaius Livius Drusus, Marcus Livius Drusus and Livia.

Political career
Livius Drusus was elected Praetor around the year 150 BC. He was then elected consul for 147 BC, alongside Scipio Aemilianus, who was possibly his first cousin. As the Third Punic War was raging, there was enormous concern in Rome about who was going to be assigned the command of the Roman forces against Carthage. Drusus, as was the custom, requested that lots be drawn to assign the provinces to the respective consuls. This was vetoed by one of the plebeian tribunes, who proposed that the assignment of the provinces be put before the concilium Plebis. The people then voted to assign the war against Carthage to Scipio Aemilianus.

References

Sources

Ancient
 Appian, Roman History, Book 8
 Cicero, Tusculanae Disputationes

Modern
 Broughton, T. Robert S., The Magistrates of the Roman Republic, Vol I (1951)
 Smith, William, Dictionary of Greek and Roman Biography and Mythology, Vol I (1867).

External links
 Family tree

2nd-century BC Roman consuls
Drusus, Gaius